815 Naval Air Squadron is a Royal Navy Fleet Air Arm squadron flying the AgustaWestland Wildcat HMA.2 helicopter and is the Navy's front line Wildcat Naval Air Squadron. The squadron is based at RNAS Yeovilton (HMS Heron) in Somerset. The squadron is capable of carrying out multiple roles such as: counter-narcotics, anti-piracy, Above Surface Warfare (ASW), search and rescue, disaster relief and flying and engineering training. In the early 2000s, the Navy said that the squadron was largest helicopter squadron in Europe.

History

Second World War

The squadron formed at RNAS Worthy Down on 9 October 1939, from the remnants of 811 and 822 squadrons that had survived the sinking of their carrier  in September 1939, with Fairey Swordfish aircraft. The squadron disbanded in November 1939 but reformed the same month. In May 1940 the squadron provided support to the Dunkirk evacuation.
The squadron gained early fame with its involvement in the Battle of Taranto in 1940, when the Italian Battlefleet in harbour at Taranto was raided; which redefined the use of air power from the sea. The aircraft of the commanding officer was lost, against the crippling of half the Italian fleet. In March 1941, the squadron fought in the Battle of Cape Matapan. The squadron re-equipped in August 1941, with a mixture of Swordfish and Fairey Albacore aircraft, operating from shore bases in support of the North African campaign.
In July 1943, 815 Squadron was assigned to No. 201 (Naval Co-operation) Group with a detachment of Swordfish assigned to AHQ Malta; the units participating in Operation Husky on 10 July 1943, before 815 Squadron was disbanded.

On Fairey Barracudas

The squadron was transferred to the Far East aboard  but saw no action before VJ-Day and returned to the UK in September 1945 aboard .

Post war

Avenger and Gannet

The squadron disbanded some time after the war and reformed in 1947 from 744 Squadron, flying Grumman Avengers, which were replaced with Fairey Gannets, the last fixed-wing aircraft of the squadron when it disbanded at RNAS Culdrose (HMS Seahawk), July 1958.

Westland Whirlwind
In September 1958, the squadron reformed on Westland Whirlwind HAS.7 helicopters, moving to RNAS Portland (HMS Osprey) when engine trouble started to plague the Whirlwinds. The squadron eventually disbanded here on August 1959 by being renumbered to 737 Squadron.

Westland Wessex

On 4 July 1961, the squadron recommissioned at RNAS Culdrose with the Westland Wessex HAS.1. After a final deployment on Ark Royal, the unit disbanded at RNAS Culdrose in October 1966.

Westland Lynx

In January 1981, after a gap of some 15 years, the squadron re-commissioned at RNAS Yeovilton (HMS Heron) with the Lynx HAS.2 as the Headquarters Squadron for embarked Lynx Flights. It then moved to RNAS Portland (HMS Osprey) in 1982 and it saw action during the Falklands War of 1982. The flights were shared with 829 Naval Air Squadron until they were amalgamated in 1993, to become the largest helicopter squadron in the world. In 1998–99 after an absence of nearly 17 years, the unit moved back to RNAS Yeovilton, with the closure of RNAS Portland.

In September 2000 a Lynx Helicopter from 815 NAS took part in Operation Barras.  The aircraft, flown by Lt Cdr Al Jones and Lt Nigel Cunningham as the Observer flew over 30 missions deep into the Sierra Leone Jungle.
In 2002, a Lynx from 815 Squadron crashed into the Atlantic Ocean while participating in a joint British–American exercise, with the loss of the pilot, Lieutenant Rod Skidmore and observer, Lieutenant Jenny Lewis. Several of the Lynx helicopters are stated as part of the Response Force Task Group. In July 2012, three Lynx helicopters supported the Olympics security operation embarked on HMS Ocean tasked with intercepting aircraft that entered restricted airspace. In November 2012, the Lynx of 217 Flight deployed to the Horn of Africa for four months on board the French frigate Surcouf, the first extended deployment of a British helicopter on a French warship.

AgustaWestland Wildcat

The squadron currently operates the AgustaWestland Wildcat HMA.2 which replaced the Lynx HMA.8. The squadron received the first four of twelve Wildcats in April 2016. The retirement of the Lynx fleet began in December 2014 and was completed in March 2017.

Current composition
The squadron is composed of a Headquarters and fifteen flights and an attached Maritime Interdiction (MI) Flight. The squadron's Small Ship's Flights embark in Type 23 frigates, Type 45 destroyers or Royal Fleet Auxiliary ships. In September 2018, 213 Flight conducted the first Wildcat landing on a Queen Elizabeth-class aircraft carrier. The Maritime Interdiction (MI) Flight is maintained at high readiness to provide support and assistance to counter-terrorism in the UK. 

In 2014, the Navy said after the squadron completes the transition from the Lynx to the Wildcat the squadron would consist of twelve single-manned flights at readiness for deployed operations worldwide and two double-manned Maritime Counter Terrorism (MCT) flights at very high readiness in the UK.

Aircraft flown

The squadron flies the Wildcat HMA.2. A list of aircraft that have been flown by 815 Naval Air Squadron include:
 Fairey Swordfish Mks.I, II
 Fairey Albacore Mk.I
 Fairey Fulmar Mks.I, II
 Fairey Barracuda Mk.II, TR.3
 Grumman Wildcat Mk.VI
 Fairey Firefly T
 Grumman Avenger TBM-3E, AS.4, AS.5
 Fairey Gannet AS.1, T.2, AS.4
 Westland Whirlwind HA.R3, HAS.7
 Westland Wessex HAS.1
 Westland Lynx HAS.2, HAS.3, HMA.8
 AgustaWestland Wildcat HMA.2

Battle honours 
815 Naval Air Squadron has received the following battle honours.

 North Sea 1940
 Mediterranean 1940–42
 Taranto 1940
 Libya 1941–42
 Matapan 1941
 Burma 1944
 East Indies 1944
 Falkland Islands 1982
 Kuwait 1991

References

Citations

Bibliography

External links
 

815 Squadron
Military units and formations established in 1939
Military units and formations of the United Kingdom in the Falklands War